Shinnan Glacier (Shinnan Hyoga) is a glacier which flows northwest to the coast just east of Shinnan Rocks and marks the division between Queen Maud Land and Enderby Land. Mapped from surveys and air photos by Japanese Antarctic Research Expedition (JARE), 1957–62, and named Shinnan Hyōga (new south glacier).

See also
 Kakure Rocks, rocky exposures along the east wall of Shinnan Glacier
 List of glaciers in the Antarctic
 Glaciology

References 

Glaciers of Queen Maud Land
Prince Olav Coast